Carolyn Kroll Reidy (May 2, 1949 – May 12, 2020) was an American business executive who served as president and CEO of the American publishing company Simon & Schuster.

While chief executive, Reidy was named the publishing industry's Person of the Year by the trade publication Publishers Weekly in 2019. In 2018, she was recognized as the PEN America Publisher Honoree.

Early life and education 
Carolyn Judith Kroll was born in Washington, D.C., on May 2, 1949, the daughter of Henry August Kroll and his wife, Mildred Josephine (née Mencke), and grew up in nearby Silver Spring, Maryland. She attended Middlebury College as an undergraduate and Indiana University for graduate studies, where she earned a Ph.D. in English in 1982. Her dissertation was titled, The reader as character in the High Victorian novel: studies of the reader/writer relationship in Vanity Fair, the Way We Live Now, Middlemarch, and the Egoist.

Career
Reidy began her career in publishing in 1974 with Random House in the subsidiary rights department, and eventually became associate publisher and publisher of its subdivision, Vintage Books. She went on to be publisher and president of Avon Books.

In 1992, she joined Simon & Schuster as president of its Trade Division, then in 2001 became president of the Adult Publishing Group. She was made CEO of the entire publishing house in 2008.

Personal life and death
In 1974, she married Stephen Reidy before joining Random House.

Carolyn Reidy died of a heart attack in Southampton, NY, on May 12, 2020, aged 71.

References

External links 
 Simon and Schuster - Carolyn Reidy
 2018 Literary Gala: Carolyn Reidy, 2018 PEN America Publisher Honoree
 

1949 births
2020 deaths
Businesspeople from Washington, D.C.
Indiana University alumni
Middlebury College alumni
American women chief executives
Simon & Schuster
20th-century American businesswomen
20th-century American businesspeople
21st-century American businesswomen
21st-century American businesspeople
People from Silver Spring, Maryland
Businesspeople from Maryland